Luck is the debut studio album by Jacob Yates and the Pearly Gate Lock Pickers. Recorded between 2009 and 2011 at Green Door Studios in Glasgow, the album was released in June 2011. The album was well-received, with the music described as "dark with a mischievous grin" and as having a "Mississippi-meets-Maryhill sound".

It was named "Album of the Week" by Vic Galloway on his BBC Radio Scotland show.

Track listing

Personnel 
 Jake Lovatt - Guitar, vocals
 Richard Holmes - Bass
 Jamie Bolland - Keyboards, Guitar
 Michael Bleazard - Drums
 Engineers: Emily Maclaren, Stuart Evans
 Recorded at: Green Door Studios, Glasgow, Scotland
 Cover design: Jake Lovatt

External links 
 Jacob Yates and the Pearly Gate Lock Pickers

References 

2011 debut albums